David Alkon (born 21 April 1937) is a Mexican former sports shooter. He competed in the trap event at the 1972 Summer Olympics.

References

External links

1937 births
Living people
Mexican male sport shooters
Olympic shooters of Mexico
Shooters at the 1972 Summer Olympics
Place of birth missing (living people)